Mongoland is a Norwegian film, from 2001, by Arild Østin Ommundsen.

Having lived in England for six months Pia returns home for Christmas. She is looking for Kristoffer, her boyfriend, who was supposed to go with her abroad. It turns out rather difficult to locate him as she contacts their mutual friends.

Her search for Kristoffer results in meeting several disillusioned people. Her old friend Vegar imagines a physical defect, the rapper Gary can find no inspiration because of a lack of social problems, Wayne fled England as a result of trouble with love. Stian is working at a plant nursery after Kristoffer's fear of travelling caused their band to lose a record deal. This turns out to be also the reason he did not come with her to England.

Amidst all this Santa Claus comes to visit Pia.

External links
Mongoland at the Norwegian Film Institute

References

2001 films
Norwegian Christmas films
2000s Norwegian-language films
2001 romantic comedy films
Films scored by John Erik Kaada
Norwegian romantic comedy films